Marco Köller (born 25 June 1969) is a German former footballer.

References

External links
 Marco Köller at RSSSF

1969 births
Living people
German footballers
East German footballers
East German defectors
Berliner FC Dynamo players
MSV Duisburg players
2. Bundesliga players
DDR-Oberliga players

Association football midfielders